Al Bidda Park, formerly known as Al Rumaila Park, is a park in Doha, Qatar next to Qatar National Theater. It is near Doha Bay, overlooks the Doha Corniche and is one of the oldest and most popular parks in Doha. It is one of the areas used for birdwatching. The park includes a children's playground, small shops, and the Cultural Village, a cultural heritage center.

After being closed for renovations in November 2014, the park was reopened in February 2018 in commemoration of National Sports Day.

References

Parks in Qatar